Envirom Football Club (Envirom) is a Malawian football (soccer) club that currently plays in the TNM Super League, the top division of Malawian football.

Stadium
Currently the team plays at the 50000 capacity Kamuzu Stadium.

Honours
Southern Region Football League
Winners (1): 2012–13

References

External links

Football clubs in Malawi